The 1985 UK Athletics Championships was the national championship in outdoor track and field for the United Kingdom held at Antrim Stadium, Antrim. It was the second time that a national track and field championship was held in Northern Ireland, after hosting the 1981 event.

It was the ninth edition of the competition limited to British athletes only, launched as an alternative to the AAA Championships, which was open to foreign competitors. However, due to the fact that the calibre of national competition remained greater at the AAA event, the UK Championships this year were not considered the principal national championship event by some statisticians, such as the National Union of Track Statisticians (NUTS). Many of the athletes below also competed at the 1985 AAA Championships.

Fatima Whitbread won her fifth consecutive women's javelin throw UK title. Both the men's and women's champions defended in the 5000 metres (Eamonn Martin, Angela Tooby) and shot put (Billy Cole, Judy Oakes), as did men's hammer thrower Dave Smith. Linford Christie and John Regis recorded the same times in both the 100 metres and 200 metres finals. Christie was given the 100 m title while the two shared the 200 m title. Christie was the only athlete at the competition to win two titles.

The main international track and field competition for the United Kingdom that year was the 1985 European Cup. Three UK champions medalled at that event: Whitbread in the javelin, Angela Tooby in the 10,000 m and Tom McKean in the 800 metres. Derek Redmond was third in the 400 metres at the European competition, despite coming second at the UK race.

Medal summary

Men

Women

References

UK Athletics Championships
UK Outdoor Championships
Athletics Outdoor
Sport in County Antrim
Athletics competitions in Northern Ireland